Webbhelix is a genus of North American land snails, terrestrial pulmonate gastropod mollusks in the family Polygyridae. The genus contains several taxa which were previously included under the name Triodopsis multilineata.

Species
Species within the genus Webbhelix include: species:
 Webbhelix chadwicki (Ferris, 1907)
 Webbhelix multilineata (Say, 1821)

References

Polygyridae